The Burundi national badminton team represents Burundi in international badminton team competitions. The Burundian Federation of Badminton manages the national team. The national team was formed in 2005.

The Burundian team have only competed in team events once and that was in 2010 Thomas & Uber Cups Preliminaries for Africa where the Burundian women's team reached the semifinals and won bronze.

Participation in African Badminton Championships

Men's team

Women's team

Notable players 

Pascal Niyonkuru
Eric Niyongabo
Thierry Rutayisire
Clement Gahongore

Muriel Kezakimana
Feniste Ndihokubwayo
Aline Nininahazwe
Jeanine Nkurunziza

Current squad 

Male players
Patrick-Adonis Munezero
Devy Marc Muvunyi

Female players
Kelly-Janviere Iradukunda
Berthila Niyomwungere

References

Badminton
National badminton teams
Badminton in Burundi